The Phillip Wesch House, located at 2229 Minnekahta in Hot Springs, South Dakota is a historic house built in 1890.  It was listed on the National Register of Historic Places in 1984.

It is a two-story pink sandstone house, with a shingled Jerkin head roof.  It is a work of stonemason Phillip Wesch.  Stone blocks are 18 to 22 inches thick.

References

Houses on the National Register of Historic Places in South Dakota
Houses completed in 1890
Fall River County, South Dakota